Koonki (or Kunki) is a specially trained elephant used in Mela shikar to capture wild elephants. They are used to chase the wild elephants, help in lassoing and dragging them to the depot. They are particularly trained to follow the "foot commands" from their mahouts and to move silently during the entire capturing operation.

Phandi commands
Following are the commands that phandis use to drive an elephant.

 Agad : Go forward
Pisoo/Pichoo : Go backward.
Dhutt/Datt : Stop
Beit : Lie (on belly)
Tere : Lie (on one side)
Meile/Mut : Get up

See also
Phandi

References

Elephants in India